Anton Tideman (born 2 September 1992) is a Swedish footballer who plays for Trelleborgs FF.

Career
Tideman started playing football in Laholms FK at the age of 4. He made his debut for the first team at the age of 16 in the Swedish 2nd Division. In 2011, he then joined Halmstads BK. He was the team captain of the club's U21 team in 2012.

References

External links 
 

Swedish footballers
1992 births
Living people
Allsvenskan players
Superettan players
Halmstads BK players
IK Oddevold players
Ljungskile SK players
Varbergs BoIS players
Trelleborgs FF players
Association football defenders